Sir Charles Ernest Statham (10 May 1875 – 5 March 1946) was a New Zealand politician, and the ninth Speaker of the House of Representatives, from 1923 to 1935.

Private life
He was born in Dunedin in 1875, and trained in law, practising in his own Dunedin office from 1904. He married the part-Māori Lilias Harata te Aho Burnett of Dunedin in 1905, with whom he later had one daughter.

Political career

He was on the Dunedin City Council 1911–1915.  He was the Reform Party candidate in 1911 in the Dunedin Central electorate and defeated the incumbent, James Arnold of the Liberal Party. Statham held the electorate from 1911 to 1935. He had differences with the Reform party leadership, and was returned as an Independent member in 1919. He represented a city and working-class electorate, and his majority was gradually reduced by the Labour Party. He decided to retire at the 1935 election.

He was Speaker of the House of Representatives from 1923 to 1935. He is one of only three people to have held the office despite not being from the governing party. In 1923, as an independent, but formerly a member of the Reform Party, he was backed by Reform so as not to endanger the party's slim majority, and later retained his position under the United Party. He was described as "probably the greatest speaker the house has known" and many of his rulings still form part of the parliamentary standing orders today. He was fair but firm during a stormy period. His retirement was due to the rising popularity of the Labour Party, and he did not think that he could contest the  without losing his impartiality, but fighting the election along party-lines would compromise his ability to remain Speaker.

He was created a Knight Bachelor in the 1926 King's Birthday Honours, and in 1935, he was awarded the King George V Silver Jubilee Medal. He was appointed to the New Zealand Legislative Council on 9 March 1936 and was reappointed seven years later after his term had expired and served until his death.  He did not take an active part in politics as a Legislative Councillor, though. He practised law in Wellington after retiring from Parliament, and died there on 5 March 1946. He was survived by his wife and his daughter.

Notes

References

|-

20th-century New Zealand lawyers
New Zealand finance ministers
Independent MPs of New Zealand
Dunedin City Councillors
New Zealand Knights Bachelor
Reform Party (New Zealand) MPs
Members of the New Zealand Legislative Council
Speakers of the New Zealand House of Representatives
1875 births
1946 deaths
New Zealand MPs for Dunedin electorates
Members of the New Zealand House of Representatives
New Zealand politicians awarded knighthoods